NGC 444 is a spiral galaxy of type Sd located in the constellation Pisces. It was first discovered on October 26, 1854 by R. J. Mitchell (and later listed as NGC 444), and was also spotted on October 17, 1903 by Stéphane Javelle (and later listed as IC 1658). It was described by Dreyer as "very faint, much extended 135°, a little brighter middle."

References

External links 
 

0444
18541026
Pisces (constellation)
Spiral galaxies
Discoveries by R. J. Mitchell (astronomer)
004561